Michaela Hejnová (born 10 April 1980) is a Czech former track and field athlete, specializing in the heptathlon. She has competed for the Czech Republic at the 2004 Summer Olympics and has won a bronze medal in heptathlon at the 2003 Summer Universiade in Daegu, South Korea. Hejnova set a personal best score of 6065 points at a national meet in Hradec Králové. While competing at PSK Olymp Praha in Prague, Hejnova trains for the national track and field team in heptathlon under the tutelage of her personal coach Martina Blažková.

Career
Born in Liberec, Hejnova established her heptathlon history in 1999 with a silver-medal performance at the European Junior Championships in Riga, Latvia, producing a total score of 5786 points. Four years later, Hejnova highlighted her sporting career on the world stage at the 2003 Summer Universiade in Daegu, South Korea, where she claimed the bronze behind Australian duo Kylie Wheeler and Jane Jamieson in the women's heptathlon with a score of 5795 points.

At the 2004 Summer Olympics in Athens, Hejnova qualified for the Czech team in the women's heptathlon. Less than a month before the Games, she cleared the IAAF Olympic "B" standard and improved her personal best score to 6065 points at the national trials in Hradec Králové to book her place on the Czech Olympic track and field roster. Despite putting up her rewarding effort in the javelin throw, Hejnova could only manage twenty-sixth place in the competition with a total score of 5716, nearly three hundred points below her entry standard.

Personal life
Hejnova is also the sister of 400-metre hurdler Zuzana Hejnová, who later claimed the bronze medal at the 2012 Summer Olympics in London, and two championship titles at the Worlds (both in 2013 and 2015).

Personal bests

All information taken from IAAF profile.

References

External links

Czech Olympic Team Bio 

1980 births
Living people
Czech heptathletes
Czech female athletes
Olympic athletes of the Czech Republic
Athletes (track and field) at the 2004 Summer Olympics
Universiade medalists in athletics (track and field)
Sportspeople from Liberec
Universiade bronze medalists for the Czech Republic
Medalists at the 2003 Summer Universiade